Acacia drepanocarpa is a shrub belonging to the genus Acacia and the subgenus Juliflorae native to northern Australia.

Description
It blooms between May and August producing inflorescences with yellow flowers. The resinous shrub hasp apically angular yellowish glabrous branchlets and are often scurfy and have small ridges. The phyllodes have three to five prominent, raised nerves. The glabrous, thick, coriaceous to thinly woody pods have oblique nerves and are crusted in resin and open elastically from the apex.

Taxonomy
The species was first formally described by the botanist Ferdinand von Mueller in 1859 as part of the work Contributiones ad Acaciarum Australiae Cognitionem as published in the Journal of the Proceedings of the Linnean Society. The species is often confused with Acacia polyadenia.
A. drepanocarpa belongs to the Acacia stigmatophylla group.
There are two recognised subspecies:
 Acacia drepanocarpa subsp. drepanocarpa
 Acacia drepanocarpa subsp. latifolia

Distribution
It is found in an area of the Kimberley region of Western Australia. extending into the top end of the Northern Territory and into western and central Queensland. It grows on undulating pindan plains in red sandy-gravelly soils. It is distributed from south of Broome in the west to as far east as Barkley Downs Station in western Queensland.

See also
 List of Acacia species

References

drepanocarpa
Acacias of Western Australia
Taxa named by Ferdinand von Mueller
Plants described in 1859
Flora of the Northern Territory
Flora of Queensland